Ea Kar is a district (huyện) of Đắk Lắk province in the Central Highlands region of Vietnam.

As of 2003, the district had a population of 142,525. The district covers an area of 1,021 km². The district capital lies at Ea Kar.

References

Districts of Đắk Lắk province